Sun, Sun, Sun is the second album by indie band The Elected, released in 2006 by Sub Pop.

Track listing
"Clouds Parting (8:14 a.m.)" (Blake Sennett) – 0:44
"Would You Come with Me" (Sennett) – 2:50
"Fireflies in a Steel Mill" (Sennett, Jenny Lewis, Sienna McCandless) – 4:02
"Not Going Home" (Sennett, Mike Bloom) – 4:45
"It Was Love" (Sennett) – 3:35
"Sun, Sun, Sun" (Sennett) – 3:14
"Did Me Good" (Sennett) – 4:10
"The Bank and Trust" (Sennett, Lewis) – 3:16
"Old Times" (Sennett, Bloom) – 3:43
"Desiree" (Sennett, Morgan Nagler, Michael Runion) – 2:52
"I'll Be Your Man" (Sennett) – 4:23
"Beautiful Rainbow" (Sennett) – 2:17
"Biggest Star" (Sennett, Brian Klugman) – 7:17
"At Home (Time Unknown)" (Sennett) – 0:41

Bonus disc
"Not Me" – 2:53
"I Don't Care" – 4:50
"For You" – 3:13

References

The Elected albums
2006 albums
Sub Pop albums